There have been three baronetcies created for members of the Blakiston family of Blakiston, County Durham, two in the Baronetage of England and one in the Baronetage of Great Britain. One creation is extant as of 2008.

The Blakiston Baronetcy, of the manor of Blakiston in the parish of Norton in the Bishopric of Durham, was created in the Baronetage of England on 27 May 1615 for Thomas Blakiston. He had no sons and consequently the title became extinct on his death in 1630.

The Blakiston baronetcy, of Gibside in the Bishopric of Durham, was created in the Baronetage of England on 30 July 1642 for Sir Ralph Blakiston, son of Sir William Blakiston Kt. (1562–1641). Ralph was a third cousin of Sir Thomas (mentioned above). His son Sir William, the second Baronet, died childless in 1692 and was succeeded by his younger brother Sir Francis, the third Baronet. The baronetcy became extinct on the latter's death in 1713.

The Blakiston Baronetcy, of the City of London, was created in the Baronetage of Great Britain on 22 April 1763 for Matthew Blakiston, Lord Mayor of London from 1760 to 1761. (He was 3rd cousin of Sir Thomas Blakiston of Blakiston and 4th cousin of Sir Ralph Blakiston of Gibside.) The title descended from father to son until the death of his great-grandson, the fourth Baronet, in 1883. He was unmarried and was succeeded by his nephew, Horace, the fifth Baronet. The latter died without issue in 1936 and was succeeded by his younger brother, Charles, the sixth Baronet. He also died childless and was succeeded by his nephew, Arthur, the seventh Baronet. He was also childless and on his death in 1974 the title devolved on his second cousin, Norman, the eighth Baronet. He was the grandson of Charles Robert Blakiston, youngest son of the third Baronet. As of 2008 the title is held by the eighth Baronet's eldest son, Ferguson, the ninth Baronet, who succeeded in 1977.

Five other members of the family have also gained distinction. Thomas Blakiston, son of Major John Blakiston, second son of the second Baronet, was an explorer and naturalist. John Blakiston-Houston, son of Richard Blakiston-Houston, younger son of the second Baronet, was a Member of Parliament for Down North. His third son Charles Blakiston-Houston was Member of the House of Commons of Northern Ireland for Belfast Dock from 1929 to 1933 while his fifth and youngest son John Blakiston-Houston (1882–1959) was a Major-General in the British Army. Reverend Herbert Edward Douglas Blakiston, grandson of Reverend Peyton Blakiston, youngest son of the second Baronet, was President of Trinity College, Oxford, and Vice-Chancellor of Oxford University.

The surname is usually pronounced "Blackiston".

Blakiston baronets, of the manor of Blakiston (1615)
Sir Thomas Blakiston, 1st Baronet (1582–1630)

Blakiston baronets, of Gibside (1642)
Sir Ralph Blakiston, 1st Baronet (–1650)
Sir William Blakiston, 2nd Baronet (died 1692)
Sir Francis Blakiston, 3rd Baronet (died 1716)

Blakiston baronets, of London (1763)
Sir Matthew Blakiston, 1st Baronet (–1774)
Sir Matthew Blakiston, 2nd Baronet (1761–1806)
Sir Matthew Blakiston, 3rd Baronet (1783–1862)
Sir Matthew Blakiston, 4th Baronet (1811–1883)
Sir Horace Nevile Blakiston, 5th Baronet (1861–1936)
Sir Charles Edward Blakiston, 6th Baronet (1862–1941)
Sir Arthur Frederick Blakiston, 7th Baronet (1892–1974)
Sir (Arthur) Norman Hunter Blakiston, 8th Baronet (1899–1977)
Sir Ferguson Arthur James Blakiston, 9th Baronet (born 1963)

The heir presumptive is the present holder's brother (Norman) John Balfour Blakiston (born 1964).
The heir presumptive's heir apparent is his son Nicholas James Balfour Blakiston (born 1995).

Notes

References 
Kidd, Charles, Williamson, David (editors). Debrett's Peerage and Baronetage (1990 edition). New York: St Martin's Press, 1990, 

 

Blakiston
Blakiston
1615 establishments in England
1763 establishments in Great Britain